OL Supreme is a TVB half-hour modern sitcom series.

Synopsis
Divorced LUI SIU FUNG (Liza Wang) is the CEO's secretary of a mall management company and is the head of the company's secretaries. She has been working hard for many years in the company, deeply gaining the trust of the CEO SO DAI TUNG (Cheung Kwok Keung). SO is weak and afraid of dealing with situations, therefore behind the scenes its Fung who takes care of all the big business and issues happening around the company. The office is Fung's strongest area, she is the Queen of the Office, everyone in the company is afraid of her.

The Publicity Department will soon have a new manager, during the recruitment process Fung encounters single father SI SAP YAT (Chapman To) who she did not see as a secretary for a variety of reasons, but in the end he was appointed as one. One man in the secretary world led and dominated by women will eventually lead to a series of storms. Turns out that the new manager is no other than Fung's long lost daughter MIU SIK CHI (Denise Ho)!

Sik and Fung were separated for several years, the mother and daughter were originally very happy together, but Sik is very cold towards Fung. Sik's position is even higher than Fung in the office and was not adapted to the rules set by Fung. She was also not satisfied with how Fung treated her father in the past. In the office, the relationship between the two were full of storms, troubles and hatred.

Fung and her neighbors knew each other for many years, but even after work Fung thinks of herself as a Queen. Fung is longing to learn more about her daughter Sik, but wanted to save face so she asked Sik's childhood nerdy friend LING SIU KEI (Ron Ng) who is a fan of buses to help be the mother and daughter's bridge. Kei lacked a mother since youth, while Fung who watched his growth is like a mother to him. When Sik and Kei met again, she recommended him to work in Fung's company becoming colleagues.

Cast

Awards and nominations
TVB Anniversary Awards (2010)
 Best Drama - Top 24
 Best Actress (Liza Wang) - Top 15
 Best Supporting Actor (Ron Ng) - Top 5
 Best Supporting Actress (Denise Ho) - Top 15
 My Favourite Male Character (Chapman To) - Top 15
 My Favourite Female Character (Liza Wang) - Top 15
 Most Improved Male Artiste (King Kong) - Top 5

Viewership ratings

References

External links
TVB.com O.L. Supreme - Official Website 

TVB dramas
2010 Hong Kong television series debuts
2010 Hong Kong television series endings